Sir John Cox was an English Royal Navy officer of the seventeenth century.

Cox joined the Navy during the English Republican era, but remained following the Restoration of 1660. At one point, he served as Governor of Chatham.

Cox was also appointed Captain of the Fleet and knighted. He served as the Duke of York's flag captain during the Battle of Solebay against the Dutch. The Prince was involved in some of the heaviest fighting, and Cox was killed by an enemy shot while standing close to the Duke. He was succeeded in command of the ship by John Narborough.

References

Bibliography
 Harris, Simon. Sir Cloudesley Shovell: Stuart Admiral. The History Press, 2001.

17th-century English people
Royal Navy officers
English knights
1672 deaths
Year of birth missing
Royal Navy personnel of the Third Anglo-Dutch War
English military personnel killed in action